This is the list of films produced in Yugoslavia in the 1960s. For an alphabetical list of Yugoslav films see :Category:Yugoslav films.

1960–1962

1963–1969

See also
List of Serbian films
List of Croatian films
List of Bosnia and Herzegovina films
List of films from North Macedonia
List of Slovenian films
List of Montenegrin films

External links
Yugoslav film at the Internet Movie Database

1960s
Films
Yugoslavia